The Baise Dam is a gravity dam on the You River located  west of Baise City in Guangxi, China. The dam was constructed between 2000 and 2006. The dam's power station contains four 135 MW Francis turbine generators for a total installed capacity of 540 MW and average annual generation of 1,690 GWh.

See also

List of major power stations in Guangxi
List of dams and reservoirs in China

References

Dams in China
Hydroelectric power stations in Guangxi
Dams completed in 2006
Roller-compacted concrete dams
Gravity dams
Energy infrastructure completed in 2006
2006 establishments in China